Mickaël Madar (born 8 May 1968) is a French former professional footballer who played as a striker. Madar played for the France national football team. Madar works as a football pundit on French TV channel Canal+.

Playing career
Mader was born in Paris, France, and is Jewish.

He began his professional career with Sochaux. Madar then spent one season with Laval before returning to Sochaux.

In 1992, Madar moved to Cannes before moving to Monaco in 1994. In 1996, he moved to Spain and signed for Deportivo de La Coruña, He was out for a year with a broken leg. After a season he had a confrontation with the new coach Carlos Alberto Silva (who came in summer 1997 to replace John Toshack), and Deportivo decided to let him go. 

After recovering from his injury, Madar left Spain for England where he was signed by then-Everton manager Howard Kendall in January 1998. Over the next 12 months, and two partial seasons, he played 19 league games for the club, scoring six goals, including one on his debut against Crystal Palace. 

In December 1998 Madar moved to Paris Saint-Germain. Then in 2001 he transferred to Créteil. Madar retired at the end of the season in 2002.

Madar was picked three times for France national football team, and was in the French squad for Euro 96.

Post-football career
After playing football, Madar has worked as a football pundit on French TV channel Canal+. He also owns a women's clothes shop.

See also
List of select Jewish football (association; soccer) players

References

1968 births
Living people
Footballers from Paris
Association football forwards
France international footballers
French footballers
20th-century French Jews
Jewish French sportspeople
Jewish footballers
Paris FC players
FC Sochaux-Montbéliard players
Stade Lavallois players
AS Cannes players
La Liga players
Deportivo de La Coruña players
Everton F.C. players
AS Monaco FC players
Paris Saint-Germain F.C. players
US Créteil-Lusitanos players
UEFA Euro 1996 players
Premier League players
Ligue 1 players
French expatriate footballers
Expatriate footballers in Spain
Expatriate footballers in England
French expatriate sportspeople in Spain
French expatriate sportspeople in England